Abdoulaye N'Diaye (born 28 April 1941) is a Senegalese sprinter. He competed in the men's 100 metres at the 1964 Summer Olympics.

References

1941 births
Living people
Athletes (track and field) at the 1964 Summer Olympics
Senegalese male sprinters
Olympic athletes of Senegal
Place of birth missing (living people)
African Games medalists in athletics (track and field)
African Games gold medalists for Senegal
Athletes (track and field) at the 1965 All-Africa Games